The Independence Rock Festival is a two-day music festival held annually at Chitrakoot Grounds, Mumbai. It is organised by Rock Promoter - Farhad wadia . It is the oldest and the biggest rock festival in India, and was included in MTV Iggy's list of "Top 10 Music Festivals Around the World to Check Out in 2010!."

Independence Rock
Independence Rock is India's oldest and biggest rock music festival, and has earned the sobriquet - "Woodstock of India". It is essentially the biggest platform for Rock Bands in India and has been the cradle and barometer of the Indian Rock Music scene. It is the brainchild and creation of Indian musician and promoter Farhad Wadia.

Almost every major Indian Rock act in the last 26 years has been discovered playing here, and every Indian Rock Band that has ever made any impact in India has been discovered at Independence Rock; thus making the festival a Rite of Passage for Indian Rock Acts over the last 24 years.

For over 26 years, Independence Rock has been committed to promoting Independent Music and Artists, and has given them a platform and promoted Indian artists, encouraged them and has matched their stoic perseverance with steadfast confidence in their talent. Today, these artists have found recognition on a national level and their pertinacity has brought them strong following across the nation. Independence Rock is proud to have played a significant role in bringing to prominence almost all of India's renowned rock bands.

Talent discovered at I-Rock include bands have gone ahead to achieve significant recognition in India but on an international level, a few of which are Parikrama, Zero, Pentagram, Parikrama, Motherjane, Them Clones, Demonic Resurrection, Pin Drop Violence, Indus Creed, Agni, Brahma, Gary Lawyer.

According to MTV Iggy, Independence Rock is No. 9 on the list of Top 10 Music Festivals Around the World to check out in 2010, featuring alongside music festivals like Coachella and the Roskilde Festival.

Times of India, world’s most read English newspaper has gone on to say, "... Independence Rock has been the only event in India that has regularly promoted nationwide rock talent and catered to local rock aficionados."

MTV has gone on record and said, "Independence Rock is by far the Best Local Rock Festival featuring non-international acts in all of Asia."

Channel V says, "India’s Biggest Rock Festival. It always goes house full and is truly the Woodstock of India."

I-Rock Contests 
Giving budding talent a stage has always been of great importance Independence Rock. Independence Rock has played a key part in building the celebrated stature of bands like Pentagram, Parikrama, Zero, Demonic Resurrection, Bhayanak Maut and many more – all of them found a connection with the audience at Independence Rock and have climbed the ladders of success from there on.

I-Rock XXV 
The 25th I-Rock is said to have International presence, to signify the 25th occurrence.

I-Rock XXVII 
Playing the stage were the Metal Giants Zygnema, Bhayanak Maut & Brahma. There is also a stirring solo set by Warren Mendonsa (Blackstratblues) and a brutal performance by Pentagram. Warren will also be collaborating on stage with Ehsaan Noorani & Loy Mendonsa for an incredible set.

References

External links 
 Official Website

Heavy metal festivals in India
Music festivals established in 1986